Li Nan (born September 25, 1974 in Harbin, Heilongjiang) is a former professional basketball player from China. Before his retirement in 2009, he played for the Bayi Rockets, a Chinese Basketball Association team based in Ningbo, Zhejiang. As a small forward, he is 1.98 m (6'6") tall and weighs 104 kg (230 pounds).

Li participated in four Olympics: the 1996 Atlanta Olympics Basketball Tournament, 2000 Sydney Olympics Basketball Tournament, 2004 Athens Olympics Basketball Tournament and 2008 Beijing Olympics Basketball Tournament in Beijing.

At the 2000 Olympics, Li Nan scored 25 points on 6 three-pointers in a win against Italy. 

In April 2017, it was reported that Li was appointed as the head coach of one of the two Chinese national basketball teams formed by the Chinese Basketball Association in preparation for the 2019 FIBA Basketball World Cup and 2020 Summer Olympics. Li was assigned to coach the China Red team which will participate in competitive play in 2017 while Du Feng will mentor the China Blue team which will compete in 2018.

References

External links 
 
 

1976 births
Living people
Asian Games gold medalists for China
Asian Games medalists in basketball
Asian Games silver medalists for China
Basketball players at the 1996 Summer Olympics
Basketball players at the 1998 Asian Games
Basketball players at the 2000 Summer Olympics
Basketball players at the 2002 Asian Games
Basketball players at the 2004 Summer Olympics
Basketball players at the 2006 Asian Games
Basketball players at the 2008 Summer Olympics
Bayi Rockets players
Basketball players from Harbin
Chinese basketball coaches
Chinese men's basketball players
Medalists at the 1998 Asian Games
Medalists at the 2002 Asian Games
Medalists at the 2006 Asian Games
Olympic basketball players of China
2002 FIBA World Championship players
Small forwards